Kuvayevo is a rural locality (a village) in Vorobyovskoye Rural Settlement, Sokolsky District, Vologda Oblast, Russia. The population was 1 as of 2002.

Geography 
Kuvayevo is located 68 km northeast of Sokol (the district's administrative centre) by road. Shchekotovo is the nearest rural locality.

References 

Rural localities in Sokolsky District, Vologda Oblast